The Finland national under-19 speedway team is the national under-19 motorcycle speedway team of Finland and is controlled by the Finnish Motorcycling Federation. The team was started in Team U-19 European Championship one time, but they do not qualify to the final. Finnish riders never won a medal in Individual U-19 European Championship.

Competition

See also 
 Finland national speedway team
 Finland national under-21 speedway team

External links 
 (fi) Finnish Motorcycling Federation webside

National speedway teams
Speedway
Team